Elections for Ipswich Borough Council were held on 3 May 2007. One third of the council was up for election and the council stayed under no overall control.

After the election, the composition of the council was:
Conservative 20
Labour 18
Liberal Democrat 9
Independent 1

Following the election the Conservatives and Liberal Democrats continued to form the executive of the council.

Election result

Ward results

Alexandra

Bixley

Bridge

Castle Hill

Gainsborough

Gipping

Holywells

Priory Heath

Rushmere

Sprites

St John's

St Margaret's

Stoke Park

Westgate

Whitehouse

Whitton

References
2007 Ipswich election result
Full ward results
Little change at Ipswich after vote

2007 English local elections
2007
2000s in Suffolk